Whigfield Sextape is a 4 track EP from the Irish alternative rock group Fight Like Apes. This is the band's first release since 2010's The Body of Christ and the Legs of Tina Turner

Track listing

Fight Like Apes albums
2014 EPs
Alcopop! Records EPs